Madhuca curtisii is a tree in the family Sapotaceae.

Description
The bark is reddish brown. Inflorescences bear up to 12 flowers, which are fragrant and greenish cream-coloured.

Distribution and habitat
Madhuca curtisii is native to Peninsular Malaysia and Borneo. Its habitat is forests to  altitude.

Conservation
Madhuca curtisii has been assessed as vulnerable on the IUCN Red List. The species is threatened by logging and conversion of land for palm oil plantations.

References

curtisii
Trees of Peninsular Malaysia
Trees of Borneo
Plants described in 1906